The 2012 Campeonato Paulista de Futebol Profissional da Primeira Divisão - Série A1 (officially the Paulistão Chevrolet 2012 for sponsorship reasons) was the 111th season of São Paulo's top professional football league.

The finals were played between Santos and Guarani. Santos won 7–2 on aggregate. It was the third consecutive year that they won, the first time since 1968, when the same Santos won three years in a row for the last time (1966/1967/1968).

Format
The top eight teams in the First Stage qualifies to the Quarter-Finals. The bottom four teams will be relegated to the Série A2. Quarter and Semi-Finals will be played in one-legged matches.
The best-four teams not qualified to the Semi-Finals not from the city of São Paulo or Santos FC, will compete in the Campeonato do Interior.

Teams
São Bernardo, Barueri, Noroeste and Santo André were relegated to the Campeonato Paulista Série A2 after finishing in the bottom four spots of the table at the end of the 2011 season.
Santo André were relegated after they played the finals in the 2010 season against Santos, being runner-up.
The four relegated teams were replaced by XV de Piracicaba, Comercial, Guarani and Catanduvese, that were promoted from 2011 Série A2.
Comercial return to play in the first division after 25 years away from it while XV de Piracicaba, Guarani and Catanduvense, are back after playing the last time in the years: 1995, 2009 and 1993 respectively.

First stage

League table

Results

Knockout stage

Bracket

Quarter-finals

Semi-finals

Finals

Campeonato do Interior

Semifinals

Finals

Statistics

Top goalscorers

Source UOL Esporte and Futebol Paulista
Last updated: 13 May 2012

Hat-tricks

Scoring
First goal of the season: Dener for Paulista against Portuguesa (21 January 2012)
Last goal of the season: Alan Kardec for Santos against Guarani (13 May 2012).
Fastest goal of the season: 17 seconds – Hernane for Mogi Mirim against Linense (25 March 2012)
Largest winning margin: 5 goals
Santos 6–1 Ponte Preta (25 February 2012)
Santos 5–0 Guaratinguetá (29 March 2012)
Santos 5–0 Catanduvense (15 April 2012)
Highest scoring game: 8 goals
Botafogo–SP 2–6 Palmeiras (11 March 2012)
Most goals scored in a match by a single team: 6 goals
Botafogo–SP 2–6 Palmeiras (11 March 2012)
Santos 6–1 Ponte Preta (25 February 2012)
Most goals scored in a match by a losing team: 3 goals
Comercial 3–4 Linense (21 January 2012)

Discipline
Most yellow cards (club): 83
Bragantino
Most yellow cards (player): 9
Alan Mota (Ituano)
Domingos (Guarani)
Guilherme Andrade (Ponte Preta)
Most red cards (club): 8
Guaratingetá
Most red cards (player): 2
Alan Mota (Ituano)

Awards

Team of the year

Player of the Season
The Player of the Year was awarded to Neymar.

Young Player of the Season
The Young Player of the Year was awarded to Romarinho.

Countryside Best Player of the Season
The Countryside Best Player of the Year was awarded to Fumagalli.

Top scorer of the Season
The Top scorer award went to Neymar, who scored 20 goals.

References

Campeonato Paulista seasons
Paulista